is a passenger railway station in located in the city of Kainan, Wakayama Prefecture, Japan, operated by West Japan Railway Company (JR West).

Lines

Station layout
The station consists of two opposed side platforms connected by an elevated station building. The station is staffed.

Platforms

Adjacent stations

|-
!colspan=5|West Japan Railway Company (JR West)

History
Kuroe Station opened on November 1, 1966. With the privatization of the Japan National Railways (JNR) on April 1, 1987, the station came under the aegis of the West Japan Railway Company.

Passenger statistics
In fiscal 2019, the station was used by an average of 2527 passengers daily (boarding passengers only).

Surrounding Area
 Chiben Gakuen Wakayama Elementary School / Junior High School / High School
Kimiidera Park

See also
List of railway stations in Japan

References

External links

 Kuroe Station Official Site

Railway stations in Wakayama Prefecture
Railway stations in Japan opened in 1966
Kainan, Wakayama